The 1995 National Football League expansion draft was held on February 15, 1995. The two new expansion teams, the Carolina Panthers and the Jacksonville Jaguars, alternated picks from lists of unprotected players from existing franchises. Existing NFL teams made six players available, and the new teams were required to pick a minimum of 30 and a maximum of 42 players. Each time one of the expansion franchises selected a player from an existing team, that team was then permitted to remove a remaining player from its list of available players.

The Jaguars were awarded the first pick in the expansion draft after winning a coin toss. The Panthers were then awarded the first overall pick in the 1995 NFL draft (which they would eventually trade to the Cincinnati Bengals), and the Jaguars were given the second pick.

The Panthers ultimately picked 35 players, while the Jaguars picked 31.

Player selections

References

National Football League expansion draft
Expansion Draft, 1995
Carolina Panthers lists
Jacksonville Jaguars lists
NFL expansion draft